Clarior is a monotypic moth genus of the family Erebidae. Its only species, Clarior kitchingi, is known from northern Thailand. Both the genus and the species were first described by Michael Fibiger in 2010.

The wingspan is about 10.5 mm. The head, patagia, anterior part of the tegulae, prothorax, basal part of the costa, costal part of the medial area and outer half of the fringes are black. The costal medial area is quadrangular. The forewing is long, narrow and pointed at the apex. The ground colour is white yellow, suffused with light brown scales and with a black tornal patch. The crosslines are indistinct and light brown. The terminal line is indistinct and indicated by black, interneural dots. The hindwing is grey, without a discal spot. The underside of the forewing is light brown, while the underside of the hindwing is light grey.

References

Micronoctuini
Noctuoidea genera
Monotypic moth genera